John Howson ( – 6 February 1632) was an English academic and bishop.

Life
He was born in the London parish of St Bride's Church, and educated at St Paul's School.

He was a student and then a canon of Christ Church, Oxford, and Vice-Chancellor in 1602. James I of England appointed him to Chelsea College. He became rector of Brightwell Baldwin in 1608.

Conflicts in Oxford with Calvinist clergy led to his being accused in 1615 before the King of popery, by George Abbot, Archbishop of Canterbury. He was able to convince the King that the charges were misplaced, and began to rise in the hierarchy, where he was an influence on the Arminian side. He was Bishop of Oxford from 1619, and Bishop of Durham from his translation there in September 1628.

He was buried in Old St Paul's Cathedral in London, but the grave and monument were destroyed in  the Great Fire of London in 1666. His name appears on a modern monument in the crypt, listing important graves lost in the fire.

Works 

 Remarriage Be Not Permitted After Adultery (1602)
 Certain sermons made in Oxford, anno Dom, 1616 (1622)

Family
His daughter Anne married Thomas Farnaby.

References

|-

1632 deaths
17th-century Church of England bishops
Arminian ministers
Arminian writers
Bishops of Durham
Bishops of Oxford
Burials at St Paul's Cathedral
Lord-Lieutenants of Durham
Year of birth uncertain

16th-century Anglican theologians
17th-century Anglican theologians